The Loveland River House incident was a hostage crisis that occurred on January 3, 1989 at the River House Restaurant on the Big Thompson River about 4 miles west of Loveland, Colorado, Larimer County, Colorado on U.S. 34. The incident resulted in three deaths.

After a 1 hour standoff, police wounded the gunman Wayne Strozzi who subsequently killed hostage waitress Sally Mills and then himself.  Police mistakenly killed escaping hostage and restaurant patron Fenton Crookshank.

Standoff
The object of the complaint, two-tour Vietnam veteran of the 101st Airborne Division and paroled drug dealer Wayne Strozzi, age 35, armed with a 9 mm pistol confronted the police officers, wounded one, and then fled east down highway 34 with police in pursuit. Strozzi pulled his partly disabled pickup into the restaurant parking lot, entered the restaurant and initially took an off duty Loveland police officer's wife, Belva Bethel, hostage at gunpoint at the checkout counter demanding the husband, Steve Bethel, retrieve his automobile for escape.

Most patrons thought the action was a simple robbery.  Most patrons were able to exit at rear and basement exits and several were allowed to leave by the gunman.  The gunman was able to take control of about 10 to 15 remaining hostages that were a mixture of restaurant personnel and members of the Loveland Lions Club International who were meeting in the restaurant.  The gunman initially established contact with police by phone, but later destroyed the phone and contact was limited to periodic appearances in the restaurant doorway shielded by waitress Sally Mills.  His demands were for a helicopter to transport him to Libya where he said he had contacts.  He informed both hostages and police that with any assault he would proceed to kill hostages.  At one appearance at the doorway the gunman wounded a Loveland police officer who was part of the force surrounding the restaurant.

As the crisis proceeded over the next 1 hours, hostages were continuously threatened as well as police.  At one time the gunman had hostages line up single file for having their necks taped together for better control.  About 45 minutes into the standoff a young hostage and employee of the restaurant locked himself in the frozen food locker.  The distraction caused a burst of gunfire from Strozzi toward the rear doors in anticipation of a police assault.  The distraction allowed one hostage to escape without harm through the front door of the restaurant.  Another time the gunman ordered the carpets saturated with spirits from the restaurant bar indicating that he intended to burn the place down.  The husband of an elderly couple was sent out with car keys needed to clear cars from the lot while his wife remained with the group.  Strozzi announced that if he did not get demands met by 9 pm, he would proceed to kill hostages and burn the place down.

Resolution and police error
Both the Loveland city and Larimer County police participated in the standoff.  The crisis caught the Loveland city police, who had not before experienced a crisis of this magnitude, in a change of administration in which the previous chief had resigned and the new chief was to arrive the next day.  The force was under command of an acting police chief and was criticized for not calling in the Denver, Colorado police force and SWAT team which was 60 miles and likely several hours away.  At about 9 pm, a Loveland police sharpshooter positioned on a bluff overlooking the restaurant was given permission to fire and wounded the gunman with a shot through the front door window.  The shot was fired from a rifle, striking the suspect in the left torso.  The wounded gunman fell back but then fired three fatal shots into waitress Sally Mills, age 40, and killed himself with a single shot to the head.  Concurrent with the gunfire, hostage Fenton Crookshank, who was at the Lions Club meeting when the crisis began, crawled through a bathroom window facing the front of the restaurant and was killed by five shots from the Colt .45 automatic pistol of a Loveland police sergeant.

Eyewitness and official police reports differed about how Crookshank died. Police spokespersons contended that Crookshank landed on his feet, pointed an object in his right hand at and ignored "don't move" challenges by the Loveland police sergeant who mistook him for Strozzi and mistakenly shot him to death. A police investigation judged that all police shootings were justified. According to other eyewitnesses, Crookshank was shot while still in the air coming out of the window and was dead when he landed on the hood of an automobile in the parking lot.  The window was several feet south of the parking lot with a sidewalk between the vehicles and the building. The official autopsy report generally confirmed eyewitness reports stating Crookshank received five lethal shots while crawling out a front window.

Attorneys for Crookshank's family contended that his death was inexcusable, should never have happened and that police knew Strozzi was mortally wounded when Crookshank was shot.  In 1990 the city of Loveland settled with the widow and children of Crookshank for a "substantial" amount of money and also settled a lawsuit filed by attorney's for the heirs of hostage Sally Mills.

Timetable

Timetable according to police radio traffic as reported in the Loveland Reporter-Herald in local time (UTC−07:00; UTC−06:00 DST):

6:48 pm:  Loveland police officer Allen Opie and Larimer Co Deputy Jay Hirokawa respond to domestic violence call on Glade Road.

6:57-7:14:  Three officers confer about how to proceed concerning Wayne Strozzi who Barbara Strozzi claimed "it felt like he nearly broke my neck."  Her face was swollen.  Conferred on whether they need victim's cooperation to file third degree assault charges.  Showed doubt she would cooperate.

7:22:  "Officer shot, officer shot" call.  Hirokawa has been shot in the arm, Opie after hesitation relays directions to other officers.

7:41:  Report that suspect had called from the Riverhouse Restaurant ordering "get the cops out of the area."  Dispatcher says Strozzi has a female hostage, hostage is wife of police officer Steve Bethel.

Minutes later:  Officer orders ambulance back "its lights are bothering him."  Ambulance came for wounded officer Joe Berdin.

8:13:  Strozzi demands a phone, otherwise he will start to kill hostages.

8:18:  Police Sgt. Chuck Higney asks Cpl. Dick Clarke "How comfortable do you feel about a shot from there?"  Clarke says "Pretty good."

8:25:  After attempts with a bullhorn, Higney tells officers "He's not really listening to any reason right now.  He wants a plane and he wants to go to Libya and he wants it in five minutes."

8:27:  Demands are not being met, pouring flammable liquid on floor, threatens to put the building on fire.

8:31:  Strozzi appears at door of restaurant with a hostage.  Higney asks that "civilian types" be removed.  Civilians reportedly yelled "go ahead and go for it" to Strozzi at the door.

8:37:  Capt. Bill Schmoll tells SWAT team that condition "is green."  He says "I want it good gentleman, no mistakes."

8:43:  All quiet.

8:44:  A released hostage reports Strozzi lined up hostages at windows as shields.

8:58:  Rifle shot echoes through the mountains, then a few seconds later 6 shots in succession.

8:59:  "OK, everybody sit tight" a transmission says.

9:00:  Radio explodes with commands and requests, Strozzi shot a waitress.

9:02:  Strozzi is rolling around on the ground and his 9 mm is not in suspect's possession.

References

Hostage taking in the United States
Larimer County, Colorado
History of law enforcement in the United States
1989 in Colorado
1989 crimes in the United States
Attacks in the United States in 1989